is a mountain on the border of Shisō, Hyōgo Prefecture, and Mimasaka, Okayama Prefecture, Japan. It is the highest mountain in Okayama Prefecture and the third highest mountain in Hyōgo Prefecture, after Mount Hyōno and Mount Mimuro. In Hyōgo Prefecture this mountain is also known as Itabami-san and in Tottori Prefecture it is also known as Ushiro-no-sen.

Outline 
Mount Ushiro is a fault-block mountain typical of the Chūgoku Mountains. This mountain belongs to the Hyōnosen-Ushiroyama-Nagisan Quasi-National Park. It is one of Hyōgo 50 mountains as well as one of Kinki 100 mountains and the Chūgoku 100 mountains.

Religion and history 

Mount Ushiro is a center of Shugendō in this region, and called Nishi-Omine, literally, West Omine. Omine is the name of the most important mountain for Shugendō in Japan. According to a local narration in this area{fact}, this mountain was developed as a training area by En no Gyōja, the founder of Shugendō in the 7th century, for Shugensha, practitioners of Shigendō. However, Dosen-ji, which is the center for the Shugendō on this mountain, was established in the 13th century, so it would be natural to understand Shugendō on this mountain also started about that time. Mount Ushiro is one of the mountains which still have some areas which women are prohibited to enter so as to not to bother the training of Shugensha.

Access 
 Matsunoki-Bashi Bus Stop of Shinki Bus
 Omarabad Stop of Shinki Bus

References
 Ministry of Environment of Japan
 Official Home Page of the Geographical Survey Institute in Japan
 Mimasaka Tourism Navigation
 ‘Shinban Furusato Hyōgo 50 San’, Hyōgo-ken Sangaku Renmei

Ushiroyama
Ushiroyama
Shugendō